Mount Windle is an ice-covered peak rising to 1,970 m on the south side of Ferrar Glacier. It surmounts the most western massif of Cathedral Rocks in the north part of Royal Society Range, Victoria Land. Named in 1992 by Advisory Committee on Antarctic Names (US-ACAN) in association with Chaplains Tableland after Lieutenant D.L. Windle, U.S. Navy, chaplain with the 1963 winter party at McMurdo Station.

Mountains of Victoria Land
Scott Coast